Dryna is an island in Molde Municipality in Møre og Romsdal county, Norway.  It is the westernmost of the main islands in the municipality. The  island sits between the Harøyfjorden and the Midfjorden, at the entrance to the great Romsdalsfjorden. Until 1965, Dryna was part of Haram Municipality.

Dryna has a road connection to the neighboring island of Midøya to the east. There are ferry connections from the western end of the island to the village of Brattvåg and to the village of Myklebost (both in Ålesund Municipality).

Name
The Old Norse form of the name was Dryn. The name is probably derived from the word  which means "rumble" or "roar" (referring to the swell of the waves against the island).

See also
List of islands of Norway

References

Molde
Islands of Møre og Romsdal